Port Sorell is a town on the north-west coast of Tasmania, Australia.  It is on the waterway of the same name, just off Bass Strait, 20 km east of Devonport and close to Shearwater and Hawley Beach.  It borders the Rubicon Estuary, which has been identified by BirdLife International as an Important Bird Area because of its importance for waders, especially pied oystercatchers.

History
The area was named Panatana by local Aborigines. The town was originally a fishing and sealing port named Burgess, however the name was officially changed to Port Sorell (after Governor Sorell) in 1822. The town could have been a lot larger than it is now, had it not been for bushfires, after which nearby Devonport grew to become a major port. Today Port Sorell is one of many popular holiday spots along the north coast of Tasmania.

The first Port Sorell Post Office opened on 1 February 1845 and closed in 1863. The current office opened on 3 July 1944.

References

Further reading
Gardam, Faye. A History of Port Sorell 1844 - 1994. Port Sorell Sesquicentenary Committee: Latrobe, Tasmania. 1994.

External links 

Localities of Latrobe Council
Towns in Tasmania